Alejandro López (born February 9, 1975) is a Mexican race walker.

Achievements

External links

Picture of Alejandro López (right) together with Robert Korzeniowski (POL) and Jefferson Pérez (ECU)

References

 

1975 births
Living people
Mexican male racewalkers
Athletes (track and field) at the 2003 Pan American Games
Pan American Games medalists in athletics (track and field)
Pan American Games bronze medalists for Mexico
Universiade medalists in athletics (track and field)
Central American and Caribbean Games gold medalists for Mexico
Competitors at the 2002 Central American and Caribbean Games
Universiade gold medalists for Mexico
Universiade silver medalists for Mexico
Central American and Caribbean Games medalists in athletics
Competitors at the 2001 Summer Universiade
Medalists at the 1997 Summer Universiade
Medalists at the 1999 Summer Universiade
Medalists at the 2003 Pan American Games
20th-century Mexican people
21st-century Mexican people